Al-Haram (El Haram ʿAly Ibn ʿAleim, also Sayyiduna Ali or Sidna Ali "sanctuary of ʿAli [Ibn ʿAleim]"), was a Palestinian Arab village in the Jaffa Subdistrict, in Mandatory Palestine. It was located 16 km north of Jaffa, adjacent to the ruins of the medieval walled city of Arsuf, and its extent was estimated to range between 9,653 and 11,698 dunams of which 5,150 were accounted for in the cadastral registrations. It was depopulated during the 1948 war.

History

Medieval
The medieval walled city of Arsuf was captured from the Kingdom of Jerusalem by Baibars in 1265, after 40 days of siege. Its inhabitants were killed or sold as slaves and the town completely razed. The site was fully abandoned for about a century; according to the geographer Abulfeda (writing in c. 1330), the site contained no inhabitants ("Tabula Syriæ", 82). It appears that a minor village was re-established in the 16th century in the vicinity of the Sidna Ali Mosque. The mosque is mentioned by Mujir al-Din (writing c. 1496) as having been dedicated at the tomb of a Muslim saint,  ʿAli Ibn ʿAleim (d. 1081), and that Sultan Baybars had prayed at the tomb for victory prior to retaking Arsuf in 1265.

Ottoman period
In 1596, in the Ottoman era, a third of the revenues from a place called "Arsuf" went to the waqf of ʿAli Ibn ʿAleim. Pierre Jacotin called the village Ali Ebn harami on his map from 1799.
In 1880, it was described in the PEF's Survey of Western Palestine as an adobe village of moderate size on high ground, with springs to the north, and on the west a mosque. The full name was recorded as El Haram 'Aly Ibn 'Aleim.

British Mandate
In the 1922 census of Palestine conducted by the British Mandate authorities, Al-Haran had a population of 172, all Muslims increasing the 1931 census to 313, still all Muslims, in a total of 83 houses.

During the 1920s, the Palestine Land Development Company (PLDC) bought part of the village land on behalf of the American Zion Commonwealth from the Omri family of Beirut, to found the settlement of Herzliya. Later purchases of village land by the PLDC, Jewish National Fund, Keren Hayesod and private Jewish buyers was used to establish Kfar Shmaryahu and Rishpon. At the time, during the Palestinian revolt against the British Mandate, two al-Haram villagers were brought before the rebel leader Aref Abd al-Razeq, and condemned for having sold land there to the Jews, as documents are showing. According to some testimonies, the relationship between the villagers of Al-Haram and the Jews of Herzliya and Rishpon was friendly. The early settlers of Herzliya mention Arab peddlers in the streets of the town. Some of the villagers were employed in construction. Former Arab residents of al-Haram testified that before the war, representatives of the Jewish towns assured them they were safe.

In the 1945 statistics the village had a population of 880, with 360 Jewish inhabitants. Al-Haram had an elementary school for boys founded in 1921, and in 1945 it had an enrollment of 68 students. The village also contained a mosque and the shrine of al-Hasan ibn 'Ali (d. AD 1081), a descendant of the second Muslim caliph, 'Umar ibn al-Khattab.

According to Morris, the villagers were evacuated on 3 February 1948 out of fear of Jewish attack, after Haganah or Irgun attacks on nearby villages.

Today
The only trace of the former village is the Sidna Ali shrine and the cemetery which surrounds it. The cemetery is used as a parking lot by tourists. Many Muslim graves are mentioned in a 1998 archaeological publication to the west and south of the structure.

The shrine is located between the Sidna Ali Beach aka Nof Yam, and the Reshef neighbourhood of Herzliya.

References

Bibliography

 (p.215; cited in Petersen, 2001)

 
 

 
 

 
 (Al-Haram: pp.146-148)

External links
Welcome To al-Haram
al-Haram (Sayyidna 'Ali), Zochrot
Survey of Western Palestine, Map 10: IAA, Wikimedia commons
Al-Haram at Khalil Sakakini Cultural Center
 11.11.05, Zochrot
, by Eitan Bronstein, with Norma , from Zochrot 
, testimony, from Zochrot
, testimony, from Zochrot

Arab villages depopulated during the 1948 Arab–Israeli War
District of Jaffa